The 2017 Pro12 Grand Final was the final match of the 2016–17 Pro12 season. The 2016–17 season was the third with Guinness as the title sponsor and the eighth ever League Grand Final. The final was played at the Aviva Stadium in Dublin.	
The game was contested by Scarlets and Munster with Scarlets winning 46-22.

Route to the final

2017 Playoffs
The semi-finals followed a 1 v 4, 2 v 3 system with the games being played at the home ground of the higher placed teams.

Pre-match
The match was shown live on Sky Sports in Ireland and the UK, and on TG4 in Ireland, and on BBC Cymru Wales in Wales. Munster wore navy for the final with the Scarlets in red following a coin toss that took place in advance of the semi finals.
On 23 May it was announced that referee Nigel Owens would take charge of the final. It was the fifth final that he has refereed.

Match

Summary
Scarlets were dominant in the first half and had a 29–10 lead at the break after scoring four tries. They went on to add another two in the second half with Munster adding two late consolation tries.

Details

References

2016
2016–17 Pro12
2016–17 in Irish rugby union
2016–17 in Welsh rugby union
Munster Rugby matches
Scarlets matches